Fionnuala Toner (born 6 March 1990) is a Northern Ireland netball international. She represented Northern Ireland at the 2011 and 2019 Netball World Cups and at the 2014 and 2018 Commonwealth Games. She was also a member of the Northern Ireland team that were silver medallists at the 2017 European Netball Championships. She has played in the Netball Superleague for Team Northumbria, London Pulse and Team Bath. Toner is also an Ireland women's basketball international. Her younger sister, Máire Toner, is also a Northern Ireland netball international.

Early life, family and education
Toner was raised in the Malone Road district of Belfast. Her younger sister, Máire Toner, is also a Northern Ireland netball international. Between 2001 and 2008 Fionnuala attended Our Lady and St Patrick's College, where she played both netball and basketball. Between 2008 and 2009 she attended Kent School, where she played basketball and lacrosse. Between 2009 and 2013 she attended Queen's University, where she gained a BSc in Accounting. Between 2011 and 2012 she attended MacMurray College. In 2013–14 she gained a Postgraduate diploma in Advanced Accounting from Ulster University.

Netball

Clubs

Belfast Ladies
While attending Our Lady and St Patrick's College, Toner began playing netball for Belfast Ladies, the club based at her school.

Team Northumbria
As part of their preparations for the 2014 Commonwealth Games, the Northern Ireland national netball team formed a partnership with Team Northumbria. This saw Toner and six other Northern Ireland internationals – Oonagh McCullough, Noleen Lennon, Caroline O'Hanlon, Gemma Gibney, Michelle Drayne and Niamh Cooper – play for Team Northumbria during the 2014 Netball Superleague season. Toner and O'Hanlon also played for Team Northumbria during the 2015 season.

London Pulse
Toner played for London Pulse during the 2019 Netball Superleague season. She was named player of the match as the new franchise defeated Severn Stars in their opening game. She finished the season with most interceptions after appearing in all 18 matches for London Pulse.

Team Bath
Toner will play for Team Bath in the 2020 Netball Superleague season.

Northern Ireland
Toner made her senior debut for Northern Ireland at the 2009 Nations Cup. She has subsequently represented Northern Ireland at the 2011 and 2019 Netball World Cups and at the 2014 and 2018 Commonwealth Games. She was also a member of the Northern Ireland teams that won the 2015 Nations Cup  and the silver medal at the 2017 European Netball Championships.

Basketball

Schools and universities
Toner played basketball for both Our Lady and St Patrick's College and Kent School. Between 2011 and 2012 she played for MacMurray College.

Clubs
Together with Noleen Lennon, she was a member of the Ulster Rockets team that won  Basketball Ireland's Women's National Cup in January 2011. Between 2014 and 2018  she played for DCU Mercy. Her team mates at DCU included Lindsay Peat.

Ireland
Toner was included in the Ireland squad for the  2016 FIBA Women's European Championship for Small Countries.

Occupation
Since 2014 Toner has worked as an accountant for Deloitte Ireland, based in Dublin. She is a graduate of Chartered Accountants Ireland.

Honours
Northern Ireland
Nations Cup
Winners: 2009, 2015: 2 
European Netball Championship
Runner up: 2017: 1

References 

1990 births
Living people
Northern Ireland netball internationals
Netball players at the 2014 Commonwealth Games
Netball players at the 2018 Commonwealth Games
Commonwealth Games competitors for Northern Ireland
2019 Netball World Cup players
Team Northumbria netball players
London Pulse players
Team Bath netball players
Netball Superleague players
Irish women's basketball players
Ireland women's national basketball team players
Sportspeople from Lisburn
Sportspeople from Belfast
Expatriate sportspeople from Northern Ireland in the United States
Irish expatriate sportspeople in England
Deloitte people
Accountants from Northern Ireland
People educated at Our Lady and St. Patrick's College, Knock
Kent School alumni
MacMurray College alumni
Alumni of Queen's University Belfast
Alumni of Ulster University
2011 World Netball Championships players